Donald Campbell McRuer (March 10, 1826 – January 29, 1898) was an American politician from the Republican Party who served as U.S. Representative from California's 1st district from 1865 to 1867.

McRuer was born March 10, 1826, in Bangor, Maine.
He moved to San Francisco, California in 1851 during the California Gold Rush and became a commission merchant.
He was a member of the San Francisco Board of Education in 1859 and 1860.

During the Civil War, McRuer was a member of the United States Sanitary Commission.
He was elected as a Republican to the 39th United States Congress (1865–1867), but did not run for reelection.
McRuer traveled in Europe for two years, then
returned to San Francisco.
After his return he served as harbor commissioner for four years and
served on the board of directors of the Security Savings Bank of San Francisco.

McRuer died January 29, 1898, in Saint Helena, California and is buried in Saint Helena Public Cemetery.

References

1826 births
1898 deaths
United States Sanitary Commission people
Politicians from Bangor, Maine
Republican Party members of the United States House of Representatives from California
People from St. Helena, California
19th-century American politicians